Simon Graham Hinks (born 12 October 1960) is a former English professional cricketer. He played for Kent County Cricket Club and Gloucestershire County Cricket Club between 1982 and 1994, scoring over 8,700 runs in first-class cricket. Since retirement he has coached cricket and worked in sports administration at the University of Bristol.

Cricket career
Hinks was born in at Northfleet in Kent in 1960. He first played for the Kent Second XI in 1979 before making his first-class cricket debut for the county in June 1982 in a match against Hampshire at Bournemouth. He played 154 first-class and 137 list A matches for the county, playing most regularly between 1985 and 1990. He scored 1,000 first-class runs in 1985, 1989 and 1990 and made 11 centuries for Kent. His highest score of 234 was made against Middlsex at Canterbury in 1990, the innings contributing to a Kent record score for the second wicket of 366 with Neil Taylor which lasted until 2017. He was awarded his county cap in 1985.

After playing infrequently in 1991, Hinks moved to Gloucestershire for the start of the 1992 season, playing there until 1994. He played club cricket for Stroud Cricket Club and Thornbury Cricket Club. He played for Gloucestershire Cricket Board in the Minor Counties Trophy in 1998 and made a final limited-overs appearance in the 1999 NatWest Trophy.

Professional life after cricket
After retirement Hinks worked at the University of Bristol, initially as a fundraiser before rising to the position of Director of Sport, Exercise and Health. He resigned from his post at the end of 2014 and has since acted as a sports consultant and project manager and as Head Coach at the Bristol Academy of Sport based at South Gloucestershire and Stroud College. He has also coached at Thornbury CC, Gloucester City CC and previously at Old Bristolians Westbury CC and Stroud CC.

References

External links

Hinks, Simon
Hinks, Simon
Hinks, Simon
Hinks, Simon
Hinks, Simon
People from Northfleet
Gloucestershire Cricket Board cricketers